Mozambique competed at the 1984 Summer Olympics in Los Angeles, United States.

Athletics

Men
Track & road events

Women
Track & road events

Swimming

Men

References
Official Olympic Reports

Nations at the 1984 Summer Olympics
1984
Olympics